Penicillium mallochii is a species of the genus of Penicillium, which was isolated from caterpillars of Rothschildia lebeau and Citheronia lobesis in Costa Rica.

References

Further reading

 

mallochii
Fungi described in 2012